Susan Rasinski McCaw (born 1962) is an American businesswoman, former diplomat and philanthropist. She was a major fundraiser for the George W. Bush 2004 presidential campaign, and was appointed by the Bush administration as U.S. Ambassador to the Republic of Austria (2005–2007). She is currently President of SRM Capital Investments, a private investment firm. Previously, she worked at Robertson Stephens & Co., as President of COM Investments and as its Principal.

Early life and education
McCaw was born in 1962 in Orange County, California, where she was also raised. She earned a BA in Economics from Stanford University, and an MBA from Harvard Business School.

Political career
McCaw was a major fundraiser in 2004 for the Bush administration, as well as other Republican Party campaigns. She was Finance Co-Chair for Bush-Cheney '04 in Washington State and was a member of the national steering committee for W Stands for Women. She was on the Women's Coalition Advisory Board of the Republican National Committee. In 2008, McCaw served as Honorary Washington State Chair for the McCain-Palin Campaign.

McCaw was sworn in as Ambassador to Austria on November 30, 2005. United States Secretary of State Condoleezza Rice presided over the ceremony. McCaw officially assumed her post as Ambassador after presenting her diplomatic credentials to Austrian President Heinz Fischer on January 9, 2006. She announced her resignation on July 3, 2007 and left Austria on November 25, 2007.

Business career
McCaw serves on several boards including Lions Gate Entertainment Corp. (NYSE: LGF.B), Air Lease Corporation (NYSE: AL), Teach For America, the Ronald Reagan Presidential Foundation and the Stanford Institute for Economic Policy Research.  She is also an Overseer at the Hoover Institution where she is vice chair of the executive committee. In addition, McCaw is a founding board member and board chair of the Malala Fund, a nonprofit founded by Malala Yousafzai that fights for girls' education.  McCaw also serves on the Khan Academy Global Advisory Board, the Knight-Hennessy Scholars Global Advisory Board and Harvard Business School’s Board of Dean’s Advisors.  McCaw is a member of the Council on Foreign Relations and the Council of American Ambassadors. She is Trustee Emerita of Stanford University where she chaired the Development and Globalization committees.

Personal life
McCaw was married to Craig McCaw from 1998 to 2019. She has three children and resides in North Palm Beach, Florida.

References

1962 births
Living people
People from Orange County, California
Ambassadors of the United States to Austria
American women ambassadors
American women in business
Harvard Business School alumni
Stanford University alumni
Stanford University trustees
California Republicans
21st-century philanthropists
21st-century American women